KFWG-LP (98.3 FM) is a low-power FM radio station licensed to Clinton, Oklahoma, United States. The station is currently owned by Universal Truth Radio, LTD

History
The station call sign KFWG-LP on February 25, 2014.

References

External links
 
 Oklahoma Catholic Broadcasting Network

FWG-LP
Radio stations established in 2017
2017 establishments in Oklahoma
FWG-LP
Custer County, Oklahoma